A Planet in Arms is a science fiction novel by American writer Donald Barr, published in 1981.

Plot summary
A Planet in Arms is a novel in which Rohan's Planet has just won its independence from the Terran Empire of Earth and established a new government.

Reception
Greg Costikyan reviewed A Planet in Arms in Ares Magazine #9 and commented that "A Planet in Arms is a superb book."

Reviews
Review by Baird Searles (1981) in Isaac Asimov's Science Fiction Magazine, September 28, 1981

References

1981 American novels
1981 science fiction novels
Novels by Donald Barr
Novels set on fictional planets